At the Algonquin is a 2012 live jazz album by Dave Frishberg and Jessica Molaskey, featuring songs written by Frishberg. It was recorded from a March 2011 show at the historic Algonquin Hotel's Oak Room.

It was the last recorded performance at the venue before it closed in early 2012 after thirty-two years. Molaskey made her debut at the venue in 2005.

Reception 

All About Jazz lists it as a recommended album.

AllMusic critic Ken Dryden rated the album four stars, commenting "Frishberg and Molaskey make quite a team, with a playful attitude and rapport that makes it seem like they've been a team for years"

Christopher Louden of the JazzTimes lamented the loss of the venue, but said of the artists that "Jessica Molaskey is best known for swapping quips with husband John Pizzarelli, pianist and vocalist Dave Frishberg has been her frequent sparring partner over the years, and their silk-and-sandpaper rapport is every bit as engaging."

Stephen Holden reviewed the original performance and source material for the New York Times, writing "the level of craftsmanship in Mr. Frishberg’s songs is equaled only by that of Stephen Sondheim. Every phrase is chiseled, each word sealed into place, the better to allow that "little voice that whispers crystal clear” to have its say." Of Molaskey's performance, "[she's] as sympathetic an interpreter of his work as Blossom Dearie, with whom he used to perform."

Track listing

Personnel

Musicians 
 Dave Frishbergcomposer, piano, primary artist, producer, vocals
 Jessica Molaskeyprimary artist, producer, vocals

Support 
 Dave Frishbergliner notes
 Luke Meltoncover design
 Bill Mossengineer, mastering, mixing

References 

Jessica Molaskey albums
2012 live albums
Live vocal jazz albums